A man-made reservoir in Al-Anbar, Iraq, Lake Qadisiyah sits on the north side of the Haditha Dam.

Qadisiyah was formed by the damming of the Euphrates river above Haditha, Iraq. It has  of shoreline and provides irrigation water for nearby cultivated fields.

On December 3, 2006, it was the site of an emergency landing by an American CH-46E Sea Knight helicopter from the 3rd Marine Aircraft Wing that resulted in the drowning deaths of four out of its sixteen passengers.

See also
Lake Tharthar
Lake Habbaniyah
Lake Milh
Mosul Dam
List of dams and reservoirs in Iraq
Wildlife of Iraq

References

Reservoirs in Iraq
Lakes of Iraq